Ekkehard Miersch (born 4 May 1936) is a German former swimmer. He competed in the men's 100 metre backstroke at the 1956 Summer Olympics.

References

1936 births
Living people
German male swimmers
Olympic swimmers of the United Team of Germany
Swimmers at the 1956 Summer Olympics
Sportspeople from Potsdam
Male backstroke swimmers